Moonbaby is debut studio album by American singer and songwriter Siobhan Magnus.  The album was released on January 1, 2012.

Background
After the end of the American Idols LIVE! Tour 2010, Magnus returned to her alternative rock band Lunar Valve, and recorded a 3-track EP which was released in February 2011.

The album was originally announced for release on October 31, 2011, but was postponed after interest from a major label. The album was eventually released on Snotface Records, after being recorded with Pacific International Music, and was produced by Michael Flanders, who also co-wrote five of the album's songs.

1,000 pre-release signed copies were made available through her official website in December 2011. Six song teasers were released on December 5, 2011 to SoundCloud.

Album art
The art and packaging were designed by Magnus and Tony Raine. The art on the CD is of the lunar phase.

Singles
 Beatrice Dream was released on May 1, 2011. The song is named after Shakespeare's character from "Much Ado About Nothing". The official YouTube video has 17,250 views.
 Black Doll was released on October 3, 2011.  The song is inspired by Edward Gorey. The official YouTube video has 89,000 views.

Track listing

References

2012 debut albums
Siobhan Magnus albums